The  Belarusian Governorate was an administrative division of the Russian Empire established on December 12, 1796. It included the lands acquired after the Second Partition of Poland.

It was dissolved on February 27, 1802, after an administrative reform, split into Vitebsk Governorate and Mogilev Governorate.

References

Governorates of the Russian Empire